In probability theory and statistics, the Dirichlet negative multinomial distribution is a multivariate distribution on the non-negative integers. It is a multivariate extension of the beta negative binomial distribution. It is also a generalization of the negative multinomial distribution (NM(k, p)) allowing for heterogeneity or overdispersion to the probability vector. It is used in quantitative marketing research to flexibly model the number of household transactions across multiple brands.

where

then the marginal distribution of X is a Dirichlet negative multinomial distribution:

Motivation

Dirichlet negative multinomial as a compound distribution
The Dirichlet distribution is a conjugate distribution to the negative multinomial distribution. This fact leads to an analytically tractable compound distribution.
For a random vector of category counts , distributed according to a negative multinomial distribution, the compound distribution is obtained by integrating on the distribution for p which can be thought of as a random vector following a Dirichlet distribution:
 

which results in the following formula:

We can write this equation explicitly as

Alternative formulations exist. One convenient representation is

This can also be written

Properties

Marginal distributions
To obtain the marginal distribution over a subset of Dirichlet negative multinomial random variables, one only needs to drop the irrelevant 's (the variables that one wants to marginalize out) from the  vector. The joint distribution of the remaining random variates is  where  is the vector with the removed 's. The univariate marginals are said to be beta negative binomially distributed.

Conditional distributions

If m-dimensional x is partitioned as follows

and accordingly   

and
.

That is,

Conditional on the sum
That is

.

Aggregation
If

then, if the random variables with positive subscripts i and j are dropped from the vector and replaced by their sum,

Correlation matrix
For  the entries of the correlation matrix are

Heavy tailed
The Dirichlet negative multinomial is a heavy tailed distribution. Therefore the moment generating function does not exist.

Applications

Dirichlet negative multinomial as a Pólya urn model

Consider an urn initially containing  balls of  various colors including  red balls (the stopping color). The vector  gives the respective counts of the other balls of various  non-red colors. At each step of the model, a ball is drawn at random from the urn and replaced, along with one additional ball of the same color. The process is repeated over and over, until  red colored balls are drawn. Note, at the end of the experiment, the urn always contains the fixed number  of red balls while containing the random number  of the other  colors.

See also
 Beta negative binomial distribution
 Negative multinomial distribution
 Dirichlet-multinomial distribution

References 

Multivariate discrete distributions